Johanna Konta was the defending champion, but chose not to participate.

Jarmila Gajdošová won the title, defeating Lesia Tsurenko in the final, 3–6, 6–2, 7–6(7–3).

Seeds

Draw

Finals

Top half

Bottom half

References 
 Main draw

Odlum Brown Vancouver Open
Vancouver Open